The following is a list of films shot wholly or partly in the Capital Regional District surrounding Victoria, British Columbia, Canada, the capital of British Columbia. Numerous TV shows and movies have been filmed in Victoria due to its proximity to Metro Vancouver, nicknamed "Hollywood North."  A more complete list of feature films can be found at that Vancouver Island South (Greater Victoria) Film & Media Commission.  www.filmvictoria.com/filming/projects-shot-in-victoria/feature-films
Other earlier films were shot at Willows Park Studio in Greater Victoria and include: 1933 The Crimson Paradise, 1935 Secrets of Chinatown, 1936 Fury and the Woman (aka Lucky Corrigan), Lucky Fugitives, Secret Patrol, Stampede, Tugboat Princess, What Price Vengeance, Manhattan Shakedown, Murder is News, Woman Against the World, Death Goes North, Convicted, Special Inspector, Commandos Strike at Dawn.

Films

References

Culture of Victoria, British Columbia